Pat Cash and John Frawley were the defending champions but Cash did not compete. Frawley competed with Jonathan Canter but lost in the quarterfinals to Karel Nováček and Norbert Teufelberger.

Mark Kratzmann and Simon Youl defeated Mihnea-Ion Năstase and Olli Rahnasto in the final, 6–4, 6–4 to win the boys' doubles tennis title at the 1983 Wimbledon Championships.

Seeds

  Jonathan Canter /  John Frawley (quarterfinals)
  Stefan Edberg /  Jonas Svensson (semifinals)
  Mihnea-Ion Năstase /  Olli Rahnasto (final)
  Mark Kratzmann /  Simon Youl (champions)

Draw

Draw

References

External links

Boys' Doubles
Wimbledon Championship by year – Boys' doubles